Almoines is a municipality in the comarca of Safor in the Valencian Community, Spain.

References

Municipalities in the Province of Valencia
Safor